The 1960 Detroit Tigers season was a season in American baseball. It involved the Tigers' sixth-place finish in the American League with a 71–83 record, 26 games behind the AL Champion New York Yankees.

Offseason 
 October 26, 1959: Gus Zernial was released by the Tigers.
 November 30, 1959: Steve Bilko was drafted by the Tigers from the Los Angeles Dodgers in the 1959 Rule 5 draft.
 December 5, 1959: Ted Lepcio, Ken Walters, and Alex Cosmidis (minors) were traded by the Tigers to the Philadelphia Phillies for Chico Fernández and Ray Semproch.
 The team changed the home jersey from featuring an Olde English 'D' to displaying "Tigers" in script; the Olde English 'D' returned in 1961.

Regular season

Season standings

Record vs. opponents

Notable transactions 
 April 12, 1960: The Tigers acquired first baseman Norm Cash from the Cleveland Indians for utility infielder Steve Demeter; Cash played in 2,018 games and slugged 373 homers for Detroit (1960–74); Demeter played in four games and was hitless in five at-bats for the Indians before disappearing into the minor leagues.
 April 17, 1960: Reigning American League batting average champion Harvey Kuenn (.353 in 1959) was traded by the Tigers to the Indians, even-up, for reigning AL home run champ Rocky Colavito (42 homers in 1959, tied with Harmon Killebrew).
 June 15, 1960: Ray Semproch and cash were traded by the Tigers to the Los Angeles Dodgers for Clem Labine.
 July 26, 1960: Harry Chiti was purchased by the Tigers from the Kansas City Athletics.
 August 3, 1960: In the only manager-for-manager trade in Major League history, the Tigers swapped Jimmy Dykes to the Indians for Joe Gordon; coaches Luke Appling and Jo-Jo White also traded teams.

Roster

Player stats

Batting

Starters by position 
Note: Pos = Position; G = Games played; AB = At bats; H = Hits; Avg. = Batting average; HR = Home runs; RBI = Runs batted in

Other batters 
Note: G = Games played; AB = At bats; H = Hits; Avg. = Batting average; HR = Home runs; RBI = Runs batted in

Pitching

Starting pitchers 
Note: G = Games pitched; IP = Innings pitched; W = Wins; L = Losses; ERA = Earned run average; SO = Strikeouts

Other pitchers 
Note: G = Games pitched; IP = Innings pitched; W = Wins; L = Losses; ERA = Earned run average; SO = Strikeouts

Relief pitchers 
Note: G = Games pitched; W = Wins; L = Losses; SV = Saves; ERA = Earned run average; SO = Strikeouts

Farm system

References

External links 

1960 Detroit Tigers season at Baseball Reference

Detroit Tigers seasons
Detroit Tigers season
Detroit Tigers
1960 in Detroit